The 1954–55 British Ice Hockey season featured a new British National League whereby the English and Scottish teams had merged into one National League.

British National League

Autumn Cup

Results

London Cup

Results

Scottish Cup

Results
First round
Paisley Pirates - Perth Panthers (4:4, win for Paisley)
Semifinals
Paisley Pirates - Dunfermline Vikings (14:3, ?)
Falkirk Lions - Ayr Raiders 12:1 on aggregate (3:0, 9:1) 
Final
 Paisley Pirates - Falkirk Lions 6:5 on aggregate (3:3, 3:2 OT)

References 

British
1955 in English sport
1954 in English sport
1954–55 in British ice hockey
1954 in Scottish sport
1955 in Scottish sport